The Kottelat rasbora (Rasbora hobelmani) is a species of ray-finned fish in the genus Rasbora.

Etymology
The fish is named in honor of Paul Hobelman, a teacher of English, in Thailand.

References 

Rasboras
Taxa named by Maurice Kottelat
Fish described in 1984